The Medal "For the Development of Railways" is a state decoration of the Russian Federation. It was established on July 9, 2007 by Presidential Decree 852.

Award Statute 
The Medal "For the Development of Railways" is awarded to citizens for their contribution to the development of rail transport in the Russian Federation and for great contribution to training, research and other activities aimed at improving railway efficiency. The medal, as a rule, is awarded to those holding the honorary title "Honoured Transport Worker of the Russian Federation". The medal can also be awarded to foreign citizens for outstanding achievements in the development of rail transport in the Russian Federation.

The Russian Federation Order of Precedence dictates the Medal "For the Development of Railways" is to be worn on the left breast with other medals immediately after the Medal For Work in Agriculture.

Award Description 
The Medal "For the Development of Railways" is circular, made of a silver metal. It is 32 mm in diameter with raised rims on each side. The obverse of the medal bears an image of the first Russian steam locomotive and a modern locomotive. The reverse bears the inscription: "FOR THE DEVELOPMENT OF RAILWAYS".

The medal is suspended to a standard Russian pentagonal mount by a ring through the medal suspension loop. The mount is covered by an overlapping 24mm wide silk moiré green ribbon with 2mm stripes of silver and black at both edges.

Notable recipients 
 Vladimir Yakunin
 Igor Levitin

See also 
 Awards and decorations of the Russian Federation
 Russian Railways

References

Civil awards and decorations of Russia
Awards established in 2007
Rail transport industry awards
Rail transport in Russia